Die Kathrin, Op. 28, is an opera in three acts by Erich Wolfgang Korngold with a German libretto by Ernst Décsey.

Performance history
Korngold completed the opera during the summer of 1937. The premiere was set for March 1938 in Vienna, but was cancelled due to Korngold's Jewish ancestry on Nazi instructions after the Nazi invasion of Austria. It finally premiered at the Royal Swedish Opera in neutral Stockholm, Sweden, on 7 October 1939, conducted by Fritz Busch.

A Vienna run of only eight performances in October 1950 met with indifferent reviews, the opera's richly melodic musical language being completely at odds with the austere post-war taste.

Roles

Recordings
 In 1998 CPO released the 1997 world premiere recording, with Martyn Brabbins conducting the BBC Concert Orchestra.

References

Operas by Erich Wolfgang Korngold
1939 operas
German-language operas
Operas